Iaia Forte (born 16 March 1962) is an Italian actress. She is probably best known for the Maurizio Nichetti's comedy film Luna e l'altra, for which she won a Nastro d'Argento for Best Actress, a Globo d'oro for Best Actress and she was nominated for David di Donatello in the same category.

Other films she  appeared in include Paz! (for which she was nominated for Nastro d'Argento as Best Supporting Actress), Il seme della discordia, Teatro di guerra, Tre mogli and The Great Beauty.

References

External links

1962 births
Living people
Italian film actresses
Nastro d'Argento winners
Ciak d'oro winners
Italian stage actresses